The Hartlepool Mail is a newspaper serving Hartlepool, England and the surrounding area. As of December 2021, it has an average daily circulation of 1,570.

History
The paper was founded in Hartlepool in 1877 as The Northern Daily Mail and continued to be printed in the town until August 2006, when the printing staff were told they would be made redundant on 30 September.

The newspaper's owners, Johnston Press, decided it was in the interests of their business to move printing to Sunderland. On 16 July 2012, most of the reporting and sports staff moved to the headquarters of the Sunderland Echo. It was also decided later that year, that the printing plant in Sunderland would close with printing of the paper moving to Dinnington, near Sheffield as a result.

In 2015, the newspaper offices were based in Houghton le Spring alongside the Sunderland Echo and Shields Gazette. In May 2019, the office then moved to its Sunderland address at the BIC on the River Wear.

In December 2020, it was announced that former Mirror Group chief executive David Montgomery's group National World had acquired the paper's owners JPI Media for £10.2m.

On Saturday 12 March 2022, the paper printed its final daily edition. It was announced that the Mail was to become a weekly paper with a new copy being released every Thursday. As a result, its cover price increased from 90p to £1.30.

Peterlee Mail 
The newspaper was formerly distributed in the Peterlee area under the Peterlee Mail name. Following a period of absence, this was replaced in June 2012 with the ""Peterlee Star"", a new weekly paid-for paper retailing at 30p, produced by the Hartlepool editorial team.

Circulation
From January to June 2011, the newspaper averaged a daily circulation of 14,198. Since then, the sales have dropped which has resulted in increases in the paper's cover price.  In November 2013, the paper cost 60p while as of April 2019, it costs 73p.

In December 2017, it had an average daily circulation of 4,183 making it the third lowest in regional newspaper daily sales in the UK. As of December 2021, that figure is now 1,570 daily sales.

The newspaper has a strong online presence and, in 2012, their website averaged 121,000 unique users a month.

Other information
The newspaper is where sports journalist and TV presenter Jeff Stelling began his career.

See also

 Sunderland Echo
 Shields Gazette
 Johnston Press
 Hartlepool Life

References

External links
 Hartlepool Mail website
 Young and Bold Feature
 Photos Today website
 Darwin Trial

Newspapers published in County Durham
Publications established in 1877
1877 establishments in England
Weekly newspapers published in the United Kingdom
Hartlepool